Alexander Murashko (born October 31, 1971) is a Belarusian former competitive figure skater. He represented Belarus at the 1994 Winter Olympics and placed 23rd in men's singles. His best result at a senior ISU Championship was 17th at the 1995 European Championships in Dortmund. After retiring from competition, Murashko became a coach in California.

Competitive highlights

References

External links 
 

1971 births
Belarusian male single skaters
Living people
Figure skaters from Minsk
Belarusian emigrants to the United States
Olympic figure skaters of Belarus
Figure skaters at the 1994 Winter Olympics